Elaphropus sedulus is a species of ground beetle in the subfamily Trechinae. It was described by Casey in 1918.

References

Beetles described in 1918